Merton Brown (May 5, 1913, Berlin, Vermont – February 20, 2001, Charlestown, Massachusetts) was an American composer who studied with Wallingford Riegger and Carl Ruggles. He often collaborated with choreographers including former Martha Graham dancer Matti Haim, José Limón, and Thomas Hewitt.

Virgil Thomson describes him as a "neo-contrapuntalist" influenced by Carl Ruggles and involved with, "rounded  material", but not so much with the, "personalized sentiment", involved in neoromanticism.

Works

Cantabile for string orchestra
Concerto Breve for string orchestra
Concerto Grosso for band
Consort for Four Voices for string quartet or two pianos
Movement for string quartet
String Trio for violin, viola, and cello
Chorale to Olin Stephens for string quintet or string orchestra
Three Motets for string quartet
Trio for flute, violin, and cello
Arioso for piano
Sonata in One Movement for piano
Piano Sonata
Toccata for piano
Three Etudes for piano
Three Songs (Rilke) for voice and string trio
Two Songs for voice and piano
Cat Duets (written for David Edgar Walther)
Poems of James Joyce

Sources

1913 births
2001 deaths
People from Berlin, Vermont
20th-century classical composers
American male classical composers
American classical composers
20th-century American composers
20th-century American male musicians